The 2021 General Tire 150 was the sixth stock car race of the 2021 ARCA Menards Series season and the 12th iteration of the event. The race was held on Saturday, May 29, 2021 in Concord, North Carolina at Charlotte Motor Speedway, a 1.5 miles (2.4 km) permanent quad-oval. The race took the scheduled 100 laps to complete. At race's end, Ty Gibbs of Joe Gibbs Racing would dominate, leading every lap to win his 12th career ARCA Menards Series win, his fourth of the season, and his third straight win.

Background 

The race was held at Charlotte Motor Speedway, located in Concord, North Carolina. The speedway complex includes a 1.5-mile (2.4 km) quad-oval track that was utilized for the race, as well as a dragstrip and a dirt track. The speedway was built in 1959 by Bruton Smith and is considered the home track for NASCAR with many race teams based in the Charlotte metropolitan area. The track is owned and operated by Speedway Motorsports Inc. (SMI) with Marcus G. Smith serving as track president.

Entry list 

*Withdrew.

Qualifying 
Qualifying would take place on Saturday, May 29, at 4:30 PM EST. The qualifying system was a 45 minute session where drivers could run as many laps as they wanted within the session to set a time.

Full qualifying results

Race results

References 

2021 ARCA Menards Series
NASCAR races at Charlotte Motor Speedway
General Tire 150 (Charlotte)
General Tire 150 (Charlotte)